is the pen name of a political activist, blogger, and writer from Kitakyushu in Fukuoka Prefecture, Japan. A former civil servant in a ward office, he is the founder and former leader of the far-right nationalist group Zaitokukai, known for its anti-foreign messages and public demonstrations which some consider unruly. Following his unsuccessful campaign in the 2016 Tokyo gubernatorial election, he founded the Japan First Party in August 2016 and is currently the party's leader.

Name
Sakurai refers to himself as "Makoto Sakurai" in public and publishes under the same name. It has been speculated that his real name may be , as he was introduced as such when he first appeared on television, on the show  in January 2005. However, on May 10, 2017, he tweeted a picture of a document pertaining to the Tokyo Gubernatorial Election with his real name , along with his pen name that he is known as written on it.

Activism

Online presence
Sakurai maintains an online presence under the username "Doronpa" and similar variations. He is currently active on his blog, Twitter, and TwitCasting accounts.

While Sakurai was a civil servant, he started gaining interest in South Korea through the Internet, and came to the conclusion that . He then afterwards relied on a Japanese-Korean online bulletin board to have thorough discussions with South Korean netizens. It is through this bulletin board he was invited to discuss South Korea in the TV show mentioned above, with himself the only one against the popularity of the country in Japan.

Sakurai lives with his mother in Shinjuku, Tokyo, where he co-manages a Family Mart convenience store part-time.

Zaitokukai

On December 2, 2006, Sakurai founded the nationalist political group Zaitokukai, short for "" and held an inaugural meeting the next month, in response to a TV news report about a group of Japanese citizens supporting Zainichi Koreans' ability to obtain national pensions without making any premium payments. Disturbed by the news and thinking that it could potentially destroy the Japanese pension system, he searched for a political organization fighting against Zainichi rights in Japan, only to find none, which led him to establish the Zaitokukai. The goals of this group is to abolish special rights towards foreigners, Koreans in particular, on the basis of nationalism, law, and the numerous criminal acts made by the perpetrators.

Sakurai was arrested by Japanese police on June 16, 2013, in Tokyo after an anti-Korean demonstration by Zaitokukai members ended in a fistfight with counterprotesters.

Sakurai held a public debate with Osaka mayor Tōru Hashimoto on October 20, 2014, regarding hate speech. The meeting lasted for only eight minutes, as Hashimoto ultimately left the stage along with his security detail after intense shouting and insulting from both sides.

On November 11, 2014, Sakurai announced that he will step down as leader of the Zaitokukai and leave the group on the 30th of the same month.

Politics
Before contesting to become the governor of Tokyo in 2016, Sakurai had stated numerous times that he would not enter the world of politics. During an assembly conducted by the Zaitokukai on August 30, 2009, in response to a participant's question regarding whether Sakurai would advance into the political world, Sakurai answered that he "would not go as far as setting aside his current life just to advance into the world of politics", denying his intention to run for office. During the debate with Osaka major Toru Hashimoto in October 2014, after receiving an explanation from Hashimoto about the responsibilities of a politician, Sakurai replied that he is not interested in becoming one. When Sakurai announced his intention to step down as leader of Zaitokukai and leave the group, he stated once again he would not be a politician.

Tokyo gubernatorial election, 2016

Following the resignation of Yoichi Masuzoe as the Governor of Tokyo, Sakurai announced his candidacy in June 2016. There was a total of 21 candidates, a record breaking number for this position.

Compared to the three main candidates (Yuriko Koike, Hiroya Masuda, and Shuntaro Torigoe), Sakurai received little media coverage during the campaign, along with seventeen other candidates, and he criticized the media in his speeches for the unequal treatment. This criticism got the approval from his rival Mac Akasaka, who was also running for Tokyo Governor. When Sakurai was featured in news coverage, however, newspapers such as The Asahi Shimbun and Tokyo Shimbun criticized Sakurai, claiming he took advantage of the election to deliver hate speech. Sankei Shimbun was the only large newspaper to feature Sakurai either neutrally or positively, even going as far as conducting a close reporting in Sakurai's campaign office the moment of the vote counting. The election placed him fifth place, with 114,171 votes or 1.74% of the popular vote.

Sakurai had seven promises for the residents of Tokyo:
 Abolish welfare for foreigners
 Halve the number of illegal immigrants within Tokyo
 Create a law banning anti-Japanese hate speech
 Legalize marijuana and send all tax revenue to the Yamaguchi-Gumi yakuza syndicate
 Enforce the regulation of Pachinko, a de facto form of gambling, which is illegal in Japan
 Cancel the establishment of a new Korean school in Tokyo
 Enforce a more compact Tokyo Olympics

He claimed that by fulfilling these promises, money and pride would go back to the hands of the Japanese to better suit the lives of the Japanese people instead of foreigners and foreign countries..

Aside from his promises, Sakurai criticized the Liberal Democratic Party for supporting Yoichi Masuzoe during the 2014 Tokyo gubernatorial election, only for him to use public money for unnecessary expenses and personal affairs leading to his resignation. Moreover, Sakurai criticized the Japanese people, especially those in their 20s and 30s, who do not vote. He urged everyone to take 20–30 minutes to go to the voting booth to cast their opinion so that there can be change in the politicians themselves, which Sakurai also criticized. He did not beg voters to vote for him; only to cast their votes.

During the campaign, Sakurai received several death threats. The culprits were high school kids, all of whom were written up and given warnings.

Tokyo gubernatorial election, 2020

On June 4, 2020 (Reiwa Second Year), he announced his intention to run for the 2020 Tokyo gubernatorial election being held on July 5 of the same year. He was running as “a candidate recommended by the Japan First Party.” The public promises that he touted in the election this time had been drastically reduced from the seven in the previous 2016 Metrop gubernatorial elect, and had become three: “Zero Tokyo inhabitant’s taxes and fixed property taxes,” “The regulation of Pachinko,” and “The immediate shutdown of welfare for foreign citizens.”

About his election campaign after June 18, 2020 (Reiwa Second Year), he was concerned about the impact of the novel coronavirus infection, so he cancelled the conventional street speeches that bring people together outdoors, and he aimed at virtual street propaganda and interviews by web broadcasts. In exceptional cases, he had carried out protest street propaganda that travelled to the Embassy of China and other places in a way that did not give prior notice so that they did not bring people together. Prior to the Metrop gubernatorial elect, he was concerned about the spread of novel coronavirus, so he had submitted a written request for the postponement of the election to the Ministry of Internal Affairs and Communications.

On June 24, 2020 (Reiwa Second Year), during a Toranomon News (Tsukasa Jōnen & Kent Gilbert appeared) studio broadcast (8:30 am), he caused a disturbance by pulling an election campaign car in front of the studio, involving the audience in it, criticizing Jōnen by name and so on. About the reports that Sakurai himself, who had prepared in advance, decided on controversial statements when Toranomon News denounced Sakurai in the program on that day, Asahi Shimbun and Kanagawa Shimbun that Toranomon News had originally denounced are those which have reported them as articles in the past, and in addition, is not that which Sakurai himself said those controversial statements are not those which Sakurai himself made.

On the other hand, two people, Shin’ichirō Suda and Yoshikatsu Ikuta, have shown a certain understanding for Sakurai, and have made positive statements.

On July 6, an apology for unauthorized use to the person entitled to Sakurai’s street propaganda videos in the Toranomon News (appearances: Ippei Orishima, Tsukasa Jōnen and Kent Gilbert) broadcast on June 24 was made.

As for the results of the election, he received 178,784 votes but lost in fifth place. Sakurai said, “Indeed, I have been defeated in the election this time. I would like to hope for Ms. Yuriko Koike’s future success. However, I think that this election at this time has set one major guideline. Virtual elections, virtual street propaganda and virtual interviews. Through these kinds of things, I suspect I was able to have everybody also feel the power of the virtual and the Net even just a little. And the next election. It means that we must make the most of them in the next election.” Even though the voter turnout in the election had decreased compared to 2016 last time, the percentage of votes won increased from 1.74% last time to 2.92%.

2021 Japanese general election

Makoto Sakurai was a candidate in the 2021 Japanese general election for the Japan First Party in the Tokyo 15th district. He received 9,449 votes or 3.96% which was the highest percentage of votes he received to date. The party also received 33,661 votes in the Tokyo proportional representation block.

Publications
All publications are in Japanese and there are no known English translations.
 "The Anti-Korean Era (大嫌韓時代)" published by Seirindo on September 24, 2014. .
 "The Anti-Korean Diary (大嫌韓日記)" published by Seirindo on June 16, 2016. .
 "Japan First Party Declaration (日本第一党宣言)" published by Seirindo on May 20, 2017. .
 Articles written by Sakurai occasionally appear in the magazine Japanism, published by Seirindo.

See also

 Ultranationalism
 Uyoku dantai
 Alt-right

Notes

References

External links
 Doronpa's Monologue , his personal blog
   (Suspended on Nov.7 2017)
 Japan First Party Website 

1972 births
Living people
People from Kitakyushu
Japanese critics
Japanese anti-communists
Japanese nationalists
Japanese writers
Japanese conspiracy theorists
Far-right politics in Japan
Zaitokukai
Tokyo gubernatorial candidates
Anti-Korean sentiment in Japan
Anti-Chinese sentiment
Alt-right activists
Alt-right in Asia
Male critics of feminism
Political activists
Pseudonymous writers
Politicians from Fukuoka Prefecture